Gerald Carr Drysdale (2 March 1887 — 19 February 1969) was an Anglo-Argentine first-class cricketer.

Drysdale was born at Buenos Aires in March 1887. He was educated in England at Wellington College, before matriculating to University College, Oxford. Returning to Argentina after his graduation from Oxford, Drysdale played first-class cricket for Argentina against the touring Marylebone Cricket Club (MCC) in February 1912, playing two matches. Playing as a middle order batsman, he scored 66 runs in his two matches, with a highest score of 36. Drysdale died in Argentina in February 1969.

References

External links

1887 births
1969 deaths
Cricketers from Buenos Aires
Argentine people of English descent
People educated at Wellington College, Berkshire
Alumni of University College, Oxford
Argentine cricketers
Argentine expatriates in the United Kingdom